Linguine (sometimes mispronounced outside Italy linguini) is a type of pasta similar to fettuccine and trenette but elliptical in section rather than flat. The name linguine means "little tongues" in Italian, where it is a plural of the feminine . A thinner version of linguine is called linguettine. Linguine was traditionally served with sauces such as pesto but others such as tomato or fish based sauces are popular as well. Linguine is typically available in both white flour and whole-wheat versions but was originally made with durum wheat. Linguine originated in Italy and is based on more traditional pastas. It is a type of pasta that finds its origin in Genoa. In the United States, National Linguine Day occurs on September 15 every year.

See also
List of pasta types
Trenette

References

Types of pasta